Jethro Compton (born 14 July 1988, Cornwall) is a British writer, director and theatre producer. He was educated at the University of York between 2006 and 2009 in English Literature. His most notable production to date has been the world première of The Man Who Shot Liberty Valance (stage play).

Career
Compton's first published play, The Man Who Shot Liberty Valance (stage play), based on the short story by Dorothy M. Johnson, premièred at Park Theatre in London in 2014. The production received a largely positive critical response with Charles Spencer of The Daily Telegraph calling it "a genuinely gripping drama and one I warmly recommend" in his four-star review. The première was directed by Compton, produced in association with Park Theatre and featured narration from Academy Award nominee, Robert Vaughn.

In 2015 Samuel French, Inc. published a trio of original Western plays by Compton entitled The Frontier Trilogy, which premièred at the Edinburgh Festival Fringe under the direction of Compton. Sally Stott described the plays in her four star review for The Scotsman as "a rollercoaster ride through the kind of high-stakes drama great theatre is all about", and called Compton "a talented and prolific writer".

Compton's adaptation of William Shakespeare's Macbeth featured as one third of The Bunker Trilogy, three plays that relocated classic stories to the First World War. Alongside Morgana and Agamemnon, written by Jamie Wilkes, the play premiered at the Edinburgh Festival Fringe in 2013 under the direction of Compton, before transferring to Southwark Playhouse in London later that year. In 2014, The Bunker Trilogy was programmed from the Adelaide Fringe Festival, where it won the Best Theatre Award, to perform at the Seoul Performing Arts Festival in South Korea with support from British Council.

Formerly one of four artistic directors of York based company Belt Up Theatre, in 2010 Compton received a bursary from Stage One, an organisation that 'aims to facilitate and encourage the development of the next generation of commercial theatre producers'. In 2011 he became an Artistic Associate of Southwark Playhouse, London

As writer

Plays
The Curious Case of Benjamin Button (musical) (2019) based on the short story by F. Scott Fitzgerald. (co-author: Darren Clark)
White Fang (stage play) (2017) based on the novel by Jack London.
Blood Red Moon part of The Frontier Trilogy (2015)
The Clock Strikes Noon part of The Frontier Trilogy (2015)
The Rattlesnake's Kiss part of The Frontier Trilogy (2015)
The Man Who Shot Liberty Valance (stage play) (2014) based on the short story by Dorothy M. Johnson.

Short fiction
San Sebastian, a prequel to The Frontier Trilogy (2015)
 Noche de Sangre, a sequel to The Frontier Trilogy (2015)

Film
El Fuego (short film) (2015)

As director

Theatre
The Curious Case of Benjamin Button (musical) (2019) based on the short story by F. Scott Fitzgerald.
White Fang (stage play) (2017) based on the novel by Jack London. 
The Frontier Trilogy (2015)
 Sirenia (2015)
 The Capone Trilogy (2014)
The Man Who Shot Liberty Valance (stage play) (2014)
 The Bunker Trilogy (2013)

Film
El Fuego (short film) (2015)

References

External links
Website for Jethro Compton Productions

Living people
British theatre directors
1988 births
Alumni of the University of York
British dramatists and playwrights
British male dramatists and playwrights